The Caldecott Tunnel fire killed seven people in the third (then-northernmost) bore of the Caldecott Tunnel, on State Route 24 between Oakland and Orinda in the U.S. state of California, just after midnight on 7 April 1982.  It is one of the few major tunnel fires involving a cargo normally considered to be highly flammable, namely gasoline.

At the time of the fire, the Caldecott tunnel complex consisted of three bores side-by-side, each . The then-northernmost bore, where the fire occurred, is dedicated to westbound traffic, traveling from Orinda to Oakland. It has a slope of approximately 4.7%, going downhill from the entry portal to the exit portal.

Description of events
Shortly after midnight, a westbound driver drifted out of lane; she was later ruled to have been legally drunk at the time. Her car struck the tunnel wall, stopping in the left-hand (fast) lane almost halfway through the tunnel.  The driver got out to inspect the damage.  The initial crash created a bottleneck for traffic coming up behind. However due to the late hour of the crash, there were few other vehicles on the road, generally traveling at high speed.

A few minutes later, a double tanker (fixed tank plus a trailer-tanker) carrying gasoline arrived at the bottleneck. By chance, there was an empty bus following close behind it. The tanker hit the car, and then braked to a halt almost exactly halfway through the tunnel. The bus hit either the car, the tanker or both; the bus driver was thrown clear of his vehicle and killed.  The bus continued driverless along the tunnel and crashed into a bridge column not far outside the exit portal.

The driver of the tanker investigated the state of his rig; it was clearly unable to move, the trailer tanker was leaking gasoline into the gutters, and small fires had started around the leaks. He ran downhill and made it safely out of the exit portal of the tunnel. By this time, burning gasoline from the punctured tanker was flowing down the drainage system.

The natural draft in the tunnel (and the 4.7% gradient) acted as a chimney encouraging the smoke to flow uphill towards the oncoming vehicles and out of the (eastern) entrance portal. The tunnel ventilation system, which was not switched on at the time of the crash, remained off throughout the event except for a brief period when the level of carbon monoxide exceeded the trigger level.

Approximately 20 vehicles entered the tunnel during the next few minutes. Most drivers managed to reverse out, prompted by the smoke moving towards them. However, four vehicles were trapped behind the burning tanker: a private car, a beer truck and two  pickups.

The two occupants of the vehicle closest to the fire (one of the pickups) began to reverse out, but soon left their vehicle and walked back uphill to warn the road users behind them. Approximately five minutes after the initial crash, one of these pedestrians called for help at one of the emergency telephones. Shortly afterwards, the fire suddenly increased in size and she was overcome by smoke; the tape recording of the call is blank.

Farther east, the occupant of the other pickup left his vehicle and ran out of the entrance portal. The two elderly occupants of a private car were overcome by smoke without ever leaving their vehicle. The two occupants of the beer truck were also overcome by smoke, and collapsed and died as they stepped out of the truck cab.

In total, two people died in the initial crash(es), five were killed by the smoke and fire, and two were hospitalized for smoke inhalation. All others escaped unharmed.

Unknown to the people fleeing east in the tunnel, there were safe passages at intervals between the tubes; these might have enabled some victims to escape from the fire and smoke, but none of the unlocked doors available were used.

Casualties
Killed
 Janice Ferris (driver of the first stopped car)
 John Dykes (driver of the bus)
 June Rutledge (on emergency telephone when a fireball occurred)
 Everett Kidney (in the beer truck)
 Melvin Young (in the beer truck)
 Katherine Lenz and George Lenz (stayed in their car)

Injured
 Steve Rutledge (in the pickup closest to the fire)
 Paul Petroelje (in the other pickup)

Emergency response
The Caldecott tunnel complex has a permanently staffed control room, and the vibrations from the initial crash were felt by those within it. The operators could also see the bus on closed-circuit TV when it emerged from the tunnel and crashed into the column.

Crews were dispatched from two local fire departments, Orinda and Oakland. Emergency services at the entry (eastern) portal took charge of those evacuated from the tunnel, while the emergency services at the exit portal were able to walk uphill to within a few tens of yards of the fire.

The first concern of the firefighters was to ensure that the gasoline running down the drainage system did not pose an explosion hazard to their firefighting efforts. Unfortunately the valves that should have been used to divert the drainage outfall to a hazardous materials sump were corroded and non-functional, and the gasoline went into a nearby lake.

Firefighting at the site in the tunnel began at 1:30 am once the potentially explosive atmosphere at the lake was under control. However, the heat of the fire had seriously affected the integrity of the tunnel firemain, and the water pressure was insufficient to support a hose stream. In the absence of an effective means of fighting it, the fire was allowed to burn out and the remnants were extinguished with foam and dry powder. The Stop message was issued at 2:54 am.

Extent of damage
About  were either discharged into the drainage or recovered from the tanker.

All the heat and smoke from the fire went uphill towards the eastern entry portal. There was no fire damage west (downhill) of the fire site.

The tiles and grout on the walls of the tunnel were damaged and spalled by intense heat all the way to the entrance portal, .

Over the first , the steel blanking plates over the ventilation flues in the false ceiling (these blanking plates are used to balance the air supply and extract rates) were buckled by heat and had to be replaced.

The tunnel's wall tiles, water pipes, lighting, communications, signage and emergency panels had to be replaced throughout the east portion of the tunnel. The ceiling tiles had previously been removed due to poor adhesion. As part of the reconstruction project, enameled metal panels were used to cover the ceiling concrete.  The third tube of the tunnel was closed for repairs lasting a period of months; costs of the reconstruction project totaled more than $3 million.

See also
 Gotthard Road Tunnel — scene of fatal crash and fire in 2001
 Kaprun disaster — a 2000 fire that occurred in an inclined funicular railway tunnel in Austria, where the tunnel's incline produced a similar chimney effect, with fatal consequences
 Memorial Tunnel — obsolete highway tunnel, now used as an emergency response training and test facility
 List of transportation fires

References

 Egilsrud, P., Prevention and Control of Highway Tunnel Fires, FHWA report RD-083-32, 1983
 Larson, D.W., Reese, R.T. and Wilmot, E.L., The Caldecott tunnel fire thermal environments, regulatory considerations and probabilities, PATRAM 83, 7th International Symposium on Packaging and Transportation of Radioactive Materials
 San Francisco Examiner, Wednesday 7 April and Thursday April 8, 1982
 Riley, N. and Lelland, A., A review of incidents involving hazardous materials in road and rail tunnels, Proceedings of the 2nd International Conference on Safety in Road and Rail Tunnels, 1995; 
 Weiger, P., Road tunnel fire safety NFPA Journal, 2000

Further reading
National Transportation Safety Board, Highway Accident Report - Multiple Vehicle Collision and Fire, Caldecott Tunnel near Oakland, California, APRIL 7, 1982 NTSB/HAR-83/01, 1983.
Jackson, L., Serious Tunnel Fires with Emphasis on the Caldecott Tunnel Fire, Oakland, California April 7, 1982. Transportation Research Board Committee A2C04, Tunnels and Underground Structures, 1983.

1982 fires in the United States
History of Oakland, California
Road incidents in the United States
Transport disasters in 1982
Fires in California
Tunnel fires
1982 in California
Transportation disasters in California
April 1982 events in the United States